Sun Tiantian (born 12 October 1981) is a Chinese former professional tennis player. She won the gold medal at the 2004 Summer Olympics in women's doubles along with her partner Li Ting.

Sun reached a career-high singles ranking of world No. 77 in March 2007, winning her only WTA Tour singles title at the 2006 Tashkent Open, and a career-high doubles ranking of No. 16 in October 2007, winning eleven WTA titles and reaching the quarterfinals of three Grand Slam women's doubles tournaments, and winning the mixed doubles event at the 2008 Australian Open alongside Nenad Zimonjić.

Career
In September 2000, Sun won two successive $10k singles titles, a feat she would repeat in June 2001, when she won another two back-to-back.

In 2002, she found repeat success at the next level up, winning two $25k tournaments: firstly in April, at Ho Chi Minh City, Vietnam (beating countrywoman Zheng Jie in the semifinal and Korean Jeon Mi-ra in the final); and then in August at Beijing (beating Zheng Jie in the semifinal again, and Rika Fujiwara in the final).

In 2003, she reached the final of a $50k tournament at Modena despite entering as a lucky loser to countrywoman Yan Zi in the final round of qualifying. Having defeated several high-quality opponents in the forms of Martina Suchá, Maret Ani and Gala León García, she lost in the final against Melinda Czink.

This year, she also gained entry into several WTA tournaments, most notably coming through qualifying at Doha by defeating Yuliana Fedak, Ľubomíra Kurhajcová and María Sánchez Lorenzo, only to lose in the deciding set of her opening round match against Nicole Pratt; and at the US Open after a narrow victory over Selima Sfar, only to lose to Saori Obata at the first hurdle in the main draw. But she finished the year ranked world No. 141.

In 2004, she qualified for the Australian Open after a win over Roberta Vinci, then qualified for Doha for the second year running. She went on to record impressive wins over Eva Birnerová and Sandra Kleinová to qualify for Miami; and over Camille Pin and Mara Santangelo to qualify for Amelia Island, where she also beat Cara Black in the main draw first round. At Wimbledon, she qualified with a win over Barbara Schwartz and won her first-round tie against Tathiana Garbin before succumbing to Anne Kremer in Round Two. At the end of the year, she lost in a tight three-set final in the first $50k Shenzhen tournament to countrywoman Li Na. Her year-end ranking had improved to world No. 118.

Sun also competed in the Summer Olympics, defeating Conchita Martínez and Virginia Ruano Pascual of Spain in the women's doubles final to win a gold medal along with her partner Li Ting.

In 2005, she reached her first WTA singles quarterfinal at Hyderabad, defeating Tamarine Tanasugarn 6–2, 6–1 in the second round before losing a close match against prominent German player Anna-Lena Grönefeld 6–7, 3–6. After several near-misses in qualifying, she again made her mark in August; both at Los Angeles, where she took French star Marion Bartoli to three sets in the second round, and in the US Open, where she qualified with convincing straight-sets wins over Marlene Weingärtner and Ľudmila Cervanová and went on to defeat Samantha Stosur, 6–3, 7–6 in the first round of the main draw, before succumbing to Anabel Medina Garrigues of Spain. But her career-best win to date was yet to come the following month at Beijing, where she defeated former world No. 1 player Serena Williams in straight sets in the second round after an easy first-round victory over Tatiana Panova of Russia, only to be outperformed in her second WTA quarterfinal by rising star Maria Kirilenko. This run of results propelled her to a career-best ranking of world No. 88, but by the close of the year, she had slipped back slightly to world No. 105.

Early in 2006, Sun suffered some extremely tough draws, but fought every inch of the way in tight three-set losses to Amélie Mauresmo in the first round of the Australian Open and Nuria Llagostera Vives in the first round at Gold Coast, only to lose in qualifying for Doha and Dubai.

At the Tashkent Open, Sun fought her way past Iroda Tulyaganova in the final to win the first WTA Tour title of her career and became only the fourth Chinese woman to win a WTA title. On 9 October 2006, she moved to a new career high of world No. 81.

She is one of only two active players (the other is Sybille Bammer of Austria) to have a winning record against Serena Williams. In their only meeting, she defeated Williams 6–2, 7–6 in the round of 16 at Beijing in 2005.

On 27 January 2008, Sun captured her first Grand Slam title when she won the Australian Open mixed doubles crown, partnering with Nenad Zimonjić. The pair defeated Sania Mirza and Mahesh Bhupathi in two sets. They won the title with their fifth championship point.

Major finals

Grand Slam finals

Mixed doubles: 1 title

Olympic finals

Doubles: 1 gold medal

WTA career finals

Singles: 1 title

Doubles: 21 (11 titles, 10 runner-ups)

ITF Circuit finals

Singles: 11 (6–5)

Doubles: 21 (13–8)

See also
 Tennis in China

References

 Chinese duo win Olympic tennis gold, China Daily 2004-08-23

External links
 
 
 

1981 births
Living people
Chinese female tennis players
Olympic gold medalists for China
Olympic tennis players of China
People from Zhengzhou
Tennis players at the 2004 Summer Olympics
Tennis players at the 2008 Summer Olympics
Olympic medalists in tennis
Asian Games medalists in tennis
Grand Slam (tennis) champions in mixed doubles
Tennis players from Henan
Medalists at the 2004 Summer Olympics
Tennis players at the 2002 Asian Games
Tennis players at the 2006 Asian Games
Medalists at the 2006 Asian Games
Asian Games bronze medalists for China
Australian Open (tennis) champions